Xinyang Minggang Airport , or Minggang Air Base, is a dual-use civil and military airport serving the city of Xinyang in Henan Province, China.

History 
The military air base formerly known as Zhumadian Airbase was built in the 1930s and served important national defense operations following the Manchurian Incident; Zhumadian was critical in supporting the Nationalist Chinese Air Force operations in the northern-front during the War of Resistance-World War II, and was where the 4th Fighter-Attack Group of the Chinese Air Force launched their close-air support missions for Chinese ground forces fighting the Imperial Japanese Army at the Battle of Taierzhuang. The airbase was completely modernized in 1958, and in September 2011, the State Council and the Central Military Commission approved the proposal to convert the base to a dual-use airport. Construction began in November 2015, and a test flight was completed on 23 May 2018. The airport was officially opened on 28 October 2018 for commercial passenger operations, with an inaugural China Eastern Airlines MU9921 flight from Xi'an Xianyang International Airport. The construction budget was 360 million yuan.

Facilities
Xinyang Minggang Airport has a runway that is 2,700 meters long and 50 meters wide (class 4C), and a 5,000 square-meter terminal building. It is projected to handle 300,000 passengers and 2,500 tons of cargo per year by 2020.

Airlines and destinations

See also
List of airports in China
List of the busiest airports in China
List of People's Liberation Army Air Force airbases

References

Airports in Henan
Chinese Air Force bases
Airports established in 2018
Airports established in 1958
1958 establishments in China
2018 establishments in China